772 Naval Air Squadron (772 NAS) was a Naval Air Squadron of the Royal Navy's Fleet Air Arm.

History 

The squadron was created as a Fleet Requirements Unit on 28 September 1939, from flight 'X' of 771 Naval Air Squadron, which up to that moment had a northern element (X Flight), and a southern element (Y Flight).

Aircraft operated
The squadron operated a variety of different aircraft and versions:
 Fairey Swordfish I & II
 Blackburn Skua II
 Blackburn Roc I
 Vought Chesapeake I
 Boulton Paul Defiant TT.1
 Stinson Reliant I
 Fairey Fulmar I & II
 Miles Master II
 Supermarine Walrus
 Bristol Blenheim IV
 Hawker Hurricane IIc
 Percival Proctor II
 Vought Corsair III
 Douglas Boston III
 Douglas A-20 Havoc I
 Fairey Firefly I & NF.II
 Bristol Beaufighter X
 Grumman Martlet IV & V
 Supermarine Sea Otter
 Avro Anson I
 de Havilland Mosquito T.3, PR.XVI, B.25 & PR.34
 Supermarine Seafire L.III
 Westland Wessex HAS.1 & HU.5
 Westland Sea King HC.4

References

Citations

Bibliography

External links

700 series Fleet Air Arm squadrons
Military units and formations established in 1939
Military units and formations of the Royal Navy in World War II
Military units and formations disestablished in 1995